Pseudofrea tanganjicae is a species of beetle in the family Cerambycidae, and the only species in the genus Pseudofrea. It was described by Breuning in 1978.

References

Crossotini
Beetles described in 1978
Monotypic beetle genera